North Pomfret (also Snows Store) is an unincorporated community within the town of Pomfret in Windsor County, Vermont, United States. Its ZIP code is 05053.

Notable people
 Scott Milne, politician
 Dana Stone, journalist
 Ron Galotti, media executive

References

Unincorporated communities in Windsor County, Vermont
Unincorporated communities in Vermont